Carrickkildavnet Castle or Kildavnet Castle is a tower house and National Monument located in Achill Island, Ireland.

Location

Carrickkildavnet Castle is located in the southeast corner of Achill Island, across from the Corraun Peninsula. This is an important strategic site, protecting the mouth of Achill Sound and the passage that connects Clew Bay with Blacksod Bay.

History

Carrickkildavnet castle was built c. 1429 by the Ó Máille (O'Malley), Kings of Umaill. It was later the stronghold of Gráinne Ní Mháille (Grace O'Malley, c. 1530 – c. 1603), the famous "pirate queen." Her other strongholds were at Rockfleet Castle (on Clew Bay) and Clare Island.

Building

It is a tower house of four storeys' height. It is vaulted above the first floor and a hole at the corner of this vault is the only access to the higher levels, presumably for defensive reasons. Other defensive features include a mural chamber, machicolation, defensive loops, buttress fortifications at the top and a ruined bawn wall.

Gallery

References

National Monuments in County Mayo
Castles in County Mayo
Tower houses in the Republic of Ireland